Long Sutton is a market town in the South Holland district of Lincolnshire, England.

History
Long Sutton belonged historically to the wapentake of Elloe in the Parts of Holland.

A flood in 1236 that destroyed Wisbech Castle is also said to have washed away the village of Dolproon (or Dolprun) near Long Sutton and its existence has been handed down in the lines: "When Dolproon stood, Long Sutton was a wood. When Dolproon was washed down, Long Sutton became a town."

The Friday market dates back to the early 13th century when the town was a prosperous trading centre. By the mid-14th century, it was considered to be one of the richest communities in Lincolnshire.

In the 1800s the town was on the circuits of touring theatre companies, in 1842 the Bullen theatre company performed here.

Prosperity continued into the 20th century, helped by the arrival of the railways. In the 1950s eleven trains would daily transport passengers and local produce to and from the town. Long Sutton railway station on the Midland and Great Northern Joint Railway closed in 1959 when passenger services were withdrawn.

In 1987 a Butterfly Park was opened near Long Sutton. The park was closed in October 2012 after a series of losses and bad weather.

On 21 June 2012, at about 2:30 pm, a tornado hit Long Sutton. Particular damage was caused in Woad Lane with the tornado "leaving a trail of destruction in its wake".

Governance
An electoral ward in the same name exists. This stretches south to Tydd St Mary, with a total population at the 2011 Census of 7,260.

Community
Long Sutton is the terminus of the A1101. It is now bypassed, with Sutton Bridge, by the A17 which follows the former railway. In 2001 the town had a population of 6,461.

Long Sutton is served by one main local newspaper company, Spalding Today, which produces the Spalding Guardian and the Lincolnshire Free Press.

Food canning factory
Among the largest local employers since the 1940s was the canning factory of Lockwoods Foods Ltd in Bridge Road, between Sutton Bridge and Long Sutton. It produced a range of own-brand canned food and drink products ranging from mushy peas to seasonal strawberries and cola to ginger beer and lemonade shandy. The firm catered to UK and overseas markets, including third-party brands such as Del Monte. In the 1980s the factory was bought by Premier Foods, as Lockwoods Foods Limited went into administrative receivership. Premier Foods, among other food brands, later produced the staple Fray Bentos canned steak and kidney pie at the Long Sutton factory. After the sale of Fray Bentos to Baxters in 2011, production moved to Scotland in 2013. The factory now belongs to the Princes Food & Drink Group. Long Sutton is its largest food production site in the United Kingdom.

Facilities and landmarks
Long Sutton County Primary School is in Dick Turpin Way in the centre of Long Sutton. It has about 400 pupils. University Academy Long Sutton is the local co-educational secondary modern school.

St Mary's Church has a 13th-century lead-covered timber spire similar in design to Chesterfield Parish Church's twisted spire, but Long Sutton's is straight. The church is a Grade I listed building.
 

Within the church is a memorial inscribed "Alas! Poor Bailey" to a local surgeon, John Bailey, who was killed by robbers while returning from a visit to a patient in Tydd St Mary just after midnight on 22 April 1795. His murderers were not caught.

Town public houses are the Olde Ship Inn in London Road, the Crown and Woolpack in High Street, and the Corn Exchange and the Granary in Market Street.

Sport
The town's Long Sutton Athletic F.C. plays in the Peterborough and District Football League. It previously played in the Eastern Counties Football League.

Notable people
In birth order:
 Christopher Helme (1603 – c. 1650), born in Long Sutton, was an emigrant to Massachusetts Bay Colony and a founder of Exeter, New Hampshire.
 Dick Turpin (1705–1739), highwayman, lived in Long Sutton for about nine months as John Palmer (or Parmen). There is a road in the town named after him.
 Alfred Fletcher (1841–1915), journalist and left-wing politician, was born in Long Sutton.
 Richard Winfrey (1858–1944) was a Liberal MP, newspaper publisher and campaigner for agricultural rights. His family donated Winfrey Park.
 Henry Harold Welch Pearson (1870–1916) was a Long Sutton-born South African botanist. The African genus Pearsonia was named after him.
 Reginald Skelton (1872–1958), born in Long Sutton, was a naval vice-admiral and polar explorer. He was knighted in 1931.
 Alfred Haines (1877–1935) from Long Sutton became a first-class cricketer playing for Gloucestershire.
 Alfred Piccaver (1884–1958), operatic tenor, was born in Long Sutton.

References

External links
 
 Long Sutton Parish Council
 St Mary's church

 
Towns in Lincolnshire
Market towns in Lincolnshire
Civil parishes in Lincolnshire
South Holland, Lincolnshire